Clérambault (full title: Clérambault: The Story of an Independent Spirit During the War) is a 1920 novel by the Nobel Prize-winning French author Romain Rolland. It concerns a father's personal outcry against the militarism of the First World War, after his son dies in combat.

External links

References

1920 French novels
Novels by Romain Rolland
Novels set during World War I
Anti-war novels